Peritrox is a genus of longhorn beetles of the subfamily Lamiinae, containing the following species:

 Peritrox denticollis Bates, 1865
 Peritrox insulatus Rodrigues & Mermudes, 2011
 Peritrox marcelae Nearns & Tavakilian, 2012
 Peritrox nigromaculatus Aurivillius, 1920
 Peritrox perbra Dillon & Dillon, 1945
 Peritrox vermiculatus Dillon & Dillon, 1945

References

Onciderini